The Live Wire is a 1937 British comedy film directed by Herbert Brenon and starring Jean Gillie, Irene Ware and Arthur Wontner.

It was made at Beaconsfield Studios.

Cast
 Felix Aylmer as Wilton 
 David Burns as Snakey 
 Jean Gillie as Sally Barton 
 C. M. Hallard as Sir George Dawson 
 Kathleen Kelly as Phoebe 
 H. F. Maltby as Hodgson 
 Bernard Nedell as James Cody 
 Hugh Wakefield as Grantham 
 Irene Ware as Jane 
 Arthur Wontner as Montell 
 John Singer as Boy

References

Bibliography
 Low, Rachael. Filmmaking in 1930s Britain. George Allen & Unwin, 1985.
 Wood, Linda. British Films, 1927-1939. British Film Institute, 1986.

External links

1937 films
British comedy films
British black-and-white films
1937 comedy films
1930s English-language films
Films directed by Herbert Brenon
Films shot at Beaconsfield Studios
Films set in England
British Lion Films films
1930s British films